Symbolophorus evermanni is a species of fish in the family Myctophidae. It is widely distributed in the Indian and Pacific Oceans. The specific name evermanni honors ichthyologist Barton Warren Evermann. It is also known as Evermann's lanternfish or Evermann's lantern fish.

Symbolophorus evermanni grows to  standard length. Parasites of Symbolophorus evermanni include the copepod Peniculus hokutoae.

References 

Myctophidae
Fish of the Indian Ocean
Fish of the Pacific Ocean
Animals described in 1905
Taxa named by Charles Henry Gilbert